Ramón Mantilla Duarte C.Ss.R. (July 17, 1925 Piedecuesta - March 16, 2009) was the Colombian bishop of the Roman Catholic Diocese of Ipiales from October 25, 1985 until January 16, 1987.

Mantilla Duarte died on March 16, 2009, at the age of 83.

Notes

1925 births
2009 deaths
Redemptorist bishops
20th-century Roman Catholic bishops in Colombia
Roman Catholic bishops of Mocoa–Sibundoy
Roman Catholic bishops of Garzón
Roman Catholic bishops of Ipiales